George Beauclerk may refer to:

 Lord George Beauclerk (1704–1768), British Army officer
 George Beauclerk, 3rd Duke of St Albans (1730–1786), British peer
 George Beauclerk, 4th Duke of St Albans (1758–1787), British peer